Gianluca Galassi (born 24 July 1997) is an Italian volleyball player; a member of the Italy men's national volleyball team.

Individual Awards
 2022: FIVB World Championship – Best Middle Blocker

References

1997 births
Living people
Italian men's volleyball players
Olympic volleyball players of Italy
Volleyball players at the 2020 Summer Olympics
Sportspeople from Trento
Universiade medalists in volleyball
Universiade gold medalists for Italy
Medalists at the 2019 Summer Universiade